Dr. Greg Zaric is a Canadian economist and scientist, currently a Canada Research Chair in Health Care Management and Science at University of Western Ontario.

References

Year of birth missing (living people)
Living people
Academic staff of the University of Western Ontario
Canadian economists
University of Western Ontario alumni
University of Waterloo alumni
Stanford University alumni
Scientists from Ontario
Canadian management scientists
20th-century Canadian scientists
21st-century Canadian scientists